Nikolina Horvat (born 18 September 1986 in Zagreb) is a Croatian athlete. She competed at the 2008 Summer Olympics and the 2012 Summer Olympics in 400 m hurdles event.

Competition record

References

1986 births
Living people
Croatian female hurdlers
Olympic athletes of Croatia
Sportspeople from Zagreb
Athletes (track and field) at the 2008 Summer Olympics
Athletes (track and field) at the 2012 Summer Olympics
Mediterranean Games bronze medalists for Croatia
Athletes (track and field) at the 2009 Mediterranean Games
Mediterranean Games medalists in athletics
21st-century Croatian women